Hithaadhoo (Dhivehi: ހިތާދޫ) is one of the inhabited islands and third largest island in Baa Atoll.

Geography

Demography

References

Islands of the Maldives